"Recuérdame" is a song recorded by Spanish singer-songwriter Pablo Alborán. A single edit was released as the third single from his third studio album, Terral (2014).

A French version was released on 5 October 2015 titled, "Ne M'Oublie Pas"

In an interview with Billboard in November 2015, Alborán said; "Recuérdame" used to a song that really hurt when I sang it but then after a while it stops hurting and it’s like therapy."

Music video
The music video for "Recuérdame" was released on 9 June 2015.

Track listing
Digital download 
 "Recuérdame" - 4:52

Digital download
 "Ne M'Oublie Pas" - 4:53

Chart performance

References 

2015 singles
Pablo Alborán songs
2014 songs
Warner Music Group singles
Songs written by Pablo Alborán